Elliot Roberts (born Elliot Rabinowitz, February 25, 1943 – June 21, 2019) was an American record executive and music manager who co-founded Asylum Records, best known for helping to start and develop the careers of singer-songwriters from the late 1960s and 1970s, including those of Neil Young – whom he managed for over 50 years – and Joni Mitchell.

Biography
He was born and grew up in The Bronx, New York City, to a Jewish family who fled Nazi persecution. After graduating from high school and dropping out of two colleges, Roberts attempted a career in acting before going to work for the William Morris Agency where he met David Geffen, an agent at the firm. He became the manager of Joni Mitchell after hearing a tape provided by Buffy Sainte-Marie, and seeing Mitchell perform in New York. They both soon moved to Laurel Canyon in California. After the band Buffalo Springfield split up in 1968, Mitchell persuaded him to manage the career of fellow Canadian Neil Young. He later also managed Crosby, Stills and Nash, America, and others. Roberts formed the Geffen-Roberts Company with Geffen, and helped Geffen to create Asylum Records in 1970, which merged with Elektra Records in 1972 to form Elektra/Asylum Records. After splitting with Geffen, Roberts set up Lookout Management.
 
Roberts was Joni Mitchell's manager until 1985, and remained Neil Young's manager until his death in 2019. Young called him "the greatest manager of all time", and in his autobiography wrote of him: "Because I tend to avoid the confrontations and delivering bad news, I am not good at doing any of that. Elliot is. He knows how to communicate where I don't. Just as I wake up every day with a new idea, he wakes up every day with a new approach to solving the problems that arise with the projects I am already immersed in. There are a lot of them. This is our pattern."  Roberts himself said: "I think I'm tough. Have you ever met a guy in my position who thought he was a pussy? I'm tough, but I'm fair. No, I think I'm way tough, and I don't think I'm fair at all. Fairness comes into the equation sometimes, but when I deal with Neil for Neil, I don't care what's fair — I only care what Neil wants. Not what's fair." Roberts also supported Young's philanthropic and political work, and collaborated with Young creatively on film and video projects, often under his birth name of Elliot Rabinowitz. He launched Vapor Records with Young in 1995.

Roberts also managed Tom Petty, Tracy Chapman, Bob Dylan and The Cars. He was also associated with Jackson Browne, the Eagles, Talking Heads, Devo, Spiritualized, Mazzy Star, Devendra Banhart, The Alarm, and others.

He died in 2019, aged 76; details were not reported.

References

1943 births
2019 deaths
American music managers
American music industry executives
People from the Bronx
20th-century American Jews
21st-century American Jews